Kerala University of Health Sciences (KUHS) is a state university located in Thrissur, Kerala, India. It was established by the Kerala University of Health Sciences Act 2010, for ensuring proper and systematic instruction, teaching, training, and research and also to have uniformity in the various academic programmes in medical and allied subjects in the State of Kerala. The University is mandated to affiliate all Colleges and Institutions in Kerala, imparting professional education in health care. So far 296 professional colleges have been affiliated to the University. The Governor of Kerala serves as the University Chancellor.

History
KUHS was established in 2010 through an ordinance and later Kerala University of Health Sciences Act, 2010. All branches of treatment came under the university and medical and para-medical colleges previously functioning under different Universities, like University of Kerala, Mahatma Gandhi University, Calicut University, Kannur University, Cochin University of Science and Technology, and Sree Sankaracharya University of Sanskrit, also came under this university. The territorial jurisdiction of the university shall extend to the whole of the State of Kerala.

Affiliated colleges

This list is categorised into two parts, Autonomous colleges and Non-Autonomous colleges. Autonomous colleges are bestowed academic independence, primarily in order to enhance the level of education in those colleges.

A college may be classified as government-run, private unaided, or private aided. A government college receives full funding from the Government of Kerala, while a private unaided college receives no funding from the government. In a private aided college, one or more of its courses receives partial funding from the government.

Autonomy

Autonomy, as granted by the University Grants Commission, in concurrence with the Government of Kerala has been conferred upon selected colleges, which grants upon them, certain special privileges.

Autonomous colleges can frame their own schemes of study, curricula and evaluation, without need of the approval of the university. These colleges also have the freedom to conduct add on courses and supplementary semesters for students who may be in need of it. They also have the freedom to avail grants from funding agencies. All of these privileges are not granted to non-autonomous colleges.

Table legend
Key: 
 ‡ Some of the listed subjects may not be offered by all colleges
 ₴ Some colleges offer either DM or MCh and some both.
 ‡‡ Some courses may be offered by a single college only.

The list is further categorized into private, Government aided, and Government colleges.

Non-autonomous colleges

Government College

Private Colleges

References

External links 
 

Medical and health sciences universities in India
Public medical universities
Medical colleges in Thrissur
Universities in Kerala
2010 establishments in Kerala

Educational institutions established in 2010